Tarnia Baker (1966/1967 – 6 October 2017) was a South African politician. A native of Durban, she later moved to Mpumalanga.

She was elected to the National Assembly in 2014 as a member of the Democratic Alliance. Baker died on 6 October 2017, aged 50, after a truck hit her while she was crossing the street in Park Rynie on the KwaZulu-Natal South Coast.

References

1960s births
2017 deaths
Democratic Alliance (South Africa) politicians
Members of the National Assembly of South Africa
Road incident deaths in South Africa
People from Durban
Date of birth missing
White South African people
Women members of the National Assembly of South Africa